Russ Conway (April 25, 1913 – January 12, 2009) was a Canadian-American actor and he is best known for playing Fenton Hardy, the father of The Hardy Boys in the 1956 The Mickey Mouse Club serial. He is the brother of the actor Donald Woods (born Ralph Lewis Zink) December 2, 1906 - March 5, 1998.

Filmography

References

External links 

1913 births
2009 deaths
American male film actors
Canadian male film actors
American male television actors
Canadian male television actors
Male actors from Manitoba
People from Brandon, Manitoba
UCLA Film School alumni
Canadian emigrants to the United States
20th-century American male actors
20th-century Canadian male actors